Alfred Raymond Lowe  (born 14 June 1931) is a British recipient of the George Cross.  Lowe joined the Royal Navy as a boy seaman in January 1947.  After training at HMS Ganges he joined the crew of the aircraft carrier Illustrious.  On 17 October 1948, when aged 17, a boat he was on sank and Lowe risked his life to rescue a drowning midshipman.  For his actions in the disaster, which led to 29 deaths, including that of the midshipman, Lowe was awarded the Albert Medal for Lifesaving.  Lowe later served as a radio operator and diver and saw action in the Korean War aboard HMS Concord, receiving a mention in despatches.  Lowe retired from the navy in 1959 as a petty officer.  He later worked as a salesman in England and New Zealand.  Lowe took up the offer, made to all living Albert Medal recipients in 1971, to receive the George Cross in addition to the original medal.  He now lives in New Zealand.

Early life 
Lowe was born in London on 14 June 1931.  From the age of 12 he attended the Watts Naval School, a boarding school operated by the Barnardo's charity, in North Elmham, Norfolk.

Naval career 
In January 1947 Lowe joined the Royal Navy as a boy seaman.  He attended the HMS Ganges training establishment in Suffolk.  Lowe excelled in the seamanship classes and was one of only two boys, out of 2,000 at Ganges, to be appointed boy coxswain.

By early October 1948 Lowe was a boy first class aboard the aircraft carrier Illustrious. The carrier had spent the summer in the English Channel and Western Approaches carrying out pilot training exercises with NATO allies. On the night of 17 October Lowe was aboard a liberty boat, returning to the ship from Weymouth Pier with 51 sailors who had been on shore leave. Lowe was initially trapped under the boats canopy but broke free and swam to a lifebelt that had been thrown from Illustrious. He then removed his overcoat and shoes and swam to the ship, where he grabbed hold of a rope. Clough had fallen unconscious and Lowe could not keep his head above water; he instead dragged him to the side of the Illustrious. The crew lowered a fog buoy and Lowe placed Clough on top of this. A petty officer climbed down the rope to assist and, having secured Clough, the buoy was lifted aboard. Clough died of shock half an hour later.

The Portland disaster caused the deaths of 29 sailors and was one of the deadliest incidents in the peacetime history of the Royal Navy.  Lowe was awarded the Albert Medal for Lifesaving for disregarding his own life and leaving a place of safety to assist Clough.

Lowe continued to serve in the navy and became a radio operator and then a shallow-water diver.  He served in Hong Kong and later in the Korean War, aboard HMS Concord.  He was not involved in the landings at Inchon but took part in later naval operations there and saw action at Chongjin.  On 3 October 1952 he was mentioned in despatches "for distinguished service in operations in Korean waters".  Lowe retired from the Royal Navy as a petty officer in July 1959.

Retirement 

After leaving the navy Lowe attended a sales training course in Manchester and entered that industry.  He moved with his family to New Zealand in 1963 and settled at Milford near Auckland, working as a salesman in the flooring and boatbuilding industries.  In 1971 it was announced that Albert Medal for Lifesaving would be replaced by the George Cross.  Existing recipients could receive the George Cross while retaining their existing awards.  Lowe took up the offer, received the George Cross, and presented his Albert Medal to HMS Raleigh as an inspiration to naval recruits.  Lowe has returned to Portland periodically to attend memorial services for the victims of the 1948 disaster.  Lowe is now retired and lives at Bayswater, Auckland.

References

Medal citation 

1931 births
Living people
Sailors from London
Royal Navy personnel of the Korean War
Recipients of the Albert Medal (lifesaving)
Recipients of the George Cross